The Mini John Cooper Works WRC is a World Rally Car debuted by the Mini WRC Team during the 2011 World Rally Championship season. It is the first rally car to bear the Mini label in top-level rallying since the 1960s. The car was entered in a limited campaign for 2011, with a view to a complete championship from 2012 and was run by Prodrive, who previously had success with the Subaru Impreza WRC.

The WRC is based on the Mini Countryman and features a direct-injection 1.6 L turbocharged inline four-cylinder engine. The WRC's engine was developed by BMW Motorsport for use in a variety of motorsport series, including the FIA World Touring Car Championship.

Accolades

Wins
 2011 Rallye Mont-Blanc (Pierre Campana)
 2012 Tour de Corse (Dani Sordo and Carlos del Barrio) (with S2000 1.6T)
 2012 Qatar International Rally (Abdulaziz Al-Kuwari and Killian Duffy) (with S2000 1.6T)
 2012 Lurgan Park Rally (Kris Meeke and Gerry McVeigh)
 2013 Spanish Rally Championship (Luis Monzon and José Déniz)
 2013, 2014 Czech Rally Championship (Václav Pech and Petr Uhel) (with S2000 1.6T)
 2014 Barum Czech Rally Zlín (Václav Pech and Petr Uhel) (with S2000 1.6T)

Runners-up
 2011 Rallye de France (Dani Sordo and Carlos del Barrio)
 2012 Monte Carlo Rally (Dani Sordo and Carlos del Barrio)
 2012 Rally of Lebanon (Abdo Feghali and Marc Haddad) (with S2000 1.6T)
 2013 Barum Czech Rally Zlín (Václav Pech and Petr Uhel) (with S2000 1.6T)
 2014 Internationale Jänner Rallye (Václav Pech and Petr Uhel) (with S2000 1.6T)
 2015 Barum Czech Rally Zlín (Václav Pech and Petr Uhel) (with S2000 1.6T)

Gallery

See also
 X-raid
 Mini All4 Racing
 Andros Trophy, a non-WRC event won by a vehicle based on the Mini Countryman
 2013 Pikes Peak International Hillclimb, a non-WRC event entered by a 900 bhp vehicle based on the Mini Countryman.
 2013 Global RallyCross Championship, having events won by a Mini Countryman JCW

References 

World Rally Cars
John Cooper Works WRC
All-wheel-drive vehicles